Asadabad (also Romanized as Asadābād) is a village in Hezarmasjed Rural District, in the Central District of Kalat County, Razavi Khorasan Province, Iran. At the 2006 census, its population was 156, in 35 families.

See also 

 List of cities, towns and villages in Razavi Khorasan Province

References 

Populated places in Kalat County